David Crawford, or Crawfurd or Craufurd, (1665–1726), of Drumsoy, was a Scottish Historiographer Royal.

Life
He was the son of David Crawford of Drumsoy, and a daughter of James Crawford of Baidland, afterwards Ardmillan, a prominent opponent of the Covenanters. He was educated at the University of Glasgow and called to the bar.

Crawford was appointed historiographer for Scotland by Queen Anne.

Crawford died in 1726, leaving an only daughter and heiress, Emilia, who died unmarried in 1731.

Works
In 1706 Crawford published his Memoirs of the Affairs of Scotland, containing a full and impartial account of the Revolution in that Kingdom begun in 1567. Faithfully published from an authentic manuscript. The manuscript was, he said, presented him by Sir James Baird of Saughton Hall, who purchased it from the widow of an episcopal clergyman. The Memoirs were dedicated to the Earl of Glasgow, and the stated aim in publishing them was to provide an antidote to George Buchanan's History. On 27 July 1706 Crawford wrote to George Mackenzie, 1st Earl of Cromartie describing his appointment and controversy over the Memoirs of the Affairs of Scotland. He wrote "the title of historiographer is a terrible eyesore to some folks."

For more than a century Crawford's work was taken as a genuine unedited transcript of the manuscript, and relied on by David Hume, William Robertson, and other historians. Malcolm Laing in 1804 published The Historie and Life of King James the Sext as contained in the Belhaven manuscript, a prototype of Crawford's Memoirs. Laing asserted that the Memoirs of Crawford were akin to a forgery. Passages unfavourable to Mary, Queen of Scots had been omitted, and statements taken from the published works of William Camden, John Spottiswood, James Melville of Halhill, and others added. Another version of the original text, the Newbattle manuscript of the Historie of James the Sext, in the possession of the Marquis of Lothian, was published by the Bannatyne Club in 1825.

Crawford was also the author of:

 Courtship-a-la-mode, a comedy, 1700. 
 Ovidius Britannicus, or Love Epistles in imitation of Ovid, 1703. 
 Love at First Sight, a comedy, 1704.

See also
 Marian civil war, the subject of Memoirs of the Affairs of Scotland.

Notes

Attribution

1665 births
1726 deaths
Historians of Scotland
18th-century Scottish historians